Catherine "Cate" O'Leary (née Donegan; March 1827 – July 3, 1895) was an Irish immigrant living in Chicago, Illinois, who became famous when it was alleged that an accident involving her cow had started the Great Chicago Fire of 1871. Born Catherine Donegan, she and her husband, Patrick O'Leary, had three children, one of whom, James Patrick O'Leary, ran a well-known Chicago saloon and gambling hall.

Great Chicago Fire

On the evening of October 8, 1871, a fire consumed the O'Leary family's barn at 137 DeKoven Street. Due to a high wind and dry conditions, it spread to burn a large percentage of the city, an event known as the Great Chicago Fire.

After the Great Fire, Chicago Republican (now defunct) reporter Michael Ahern published a claim that the fire had started when a cow kicked over a lantern while it was being milked. The owner was not named, but Catherine O'Leary soon was identified because the fire had begun in her family's barn. Illustrations and caricatures soon appeared depicting Mrs. O'Leary with her cow. The idea captured the popular imagination and still is circulated widely today. However, in 1893
Ahern finally admitted he had made the story up.

The official report simply states: "Whether it originated from a spark blown from a chimney on that windy night, or was set on fire by human agency, we are unable to determine".

Mrs. O'Leary testified that she had been in bed when the fire began, and she had no idea what caused it. Daniel "Pegleg" Sullivan, the first person to raise the alarm, said that on seeing the barn on fire, he ran to free the animals, which included a cow owned by Sullivan's mother. He then informed the O'Learys, who were in their home and were unaware of the fire.
 
Anti-Irish attitudes at the time encouraged making scapegoats of the O'Leary family. It was claimed that the alleged accident happened because she was drunk or that she had hidden the evidence of her guilt. Neighbors were reported to have claimed that they saw broken glass from the lamp, though all these "reports" were unverified. One man claimed he had found the damaged lamp, but it had been stolen by another Irishman to protect the O'Learys.

Other rumors insisted that Daniel Sullivan had started the fire, or perhaps it was Louis M. Cohn, who claimed to have been gambling in the barn with the O'Learys' son and others. One of the O'Leary's sons, James Patrick O'Leary, who was only 2 years old at the time of the fire, did go on to become a well-known gambling boss and saloon owner in Chicago.

Death and aftermath

Catherine O'Leary died on July 3, 1895, of acute pneumonia at her home at 5133 Halsted Street, and was buried at Mount Olivet Cemetery. In the PBS documentary Chicago: City of the Century, a descendant of O'Leary's stated that she spent the rest of her life in the public eye, and she constantly was blamed for starting the fire. Overcome with much sadness and regret, she "died heartbroken."

The last remaining relative of Catherine O'Leary died in 1936. Amateur historian Richard Bales gathered sufficient evidence on Sullivan to convince the Chicago City Council to exonerate Mrs. O'Leary of any guilt in 1997.

Cultural references

Popular songs

 The Beach Boys' instrumental track titled "Mrs. O'Leary's Cow" was inspired by the fabled cause of the Great Chicago Fire, and served as the representation for the classical element fire on their abandoned project Smile.

Literary fiction
 A fictional interpretation of the story behind O'Leary's cow is central to the plot in Ilona Andrews' book Burn for Me.

References

External links
 Patrick & Catherine O'Leary's grave
 Mrs O'Leary and her cows

1820s births
1895 deaths
19th-century Irish people
People from Chicago
Irish emigrants to the United States (before 1923)
Great Chicago Fire